Richard Schnell (born c. 1940) is a former Canadian football player who played for the Montreal Alouettes and Saskatchewan Roughriders of the Canadian Football League. He played college football at the University of Wyoming. Schnell was drafted by the St. Louis Cardinals in the 1961 NFL Draft, but played only in the CFL.

References

Living people
1940s births
American football linebackers
Canadian football linebackers
Montreal Alouettes players
Saskatchewan Roughriders players
People from Laramie, Wyoming
Players of American football from Wyoming
Wyoming Cowboys football players
American players of Canadian football